Thorpe le Street is a hamlet and former civil parish, now in the parish of Hayton, in the East Riding of Yorkshire, England. It lies to the south of the A1079 road. In 1931 the parish had a population of 28. On 1 April 1935 the parish was abolished and merged with Hayton. The Roman Road known as Cade's Roadis thought likely to have passed through it, which would explain "-le-Street".

References

External links

Hamlets in the East Riding of Yorkshire
Former civil parishes in the East Riding of Yorkshire